Hersh Dovid Nomberg, also
written Hersh David Nomberg (14 April 1876 – 21 November 1927),
was a Polish-Jewish writer, journalist, and essayist
in the Yiddish language.

Biography
Born in the Polish town of Mszczonów, near Warsaw, he grew up in a Hasidic background, before moving to Warsaw to pursue a career as a writer. Under the influence of his mentor I. L. Peretz he began writing in Yiddish as well as Hebrew. He played an important role in the Czernowitz Conference in 1908. Nomberg also had a brief career as a politician, serving as a delegate in the Sejm for the Folkspartei.

Works
The following is a partial list of Nombergs's works.
 Happiness (fairy tale, 1900)
 "Fliglman" (short story, 1903)
 Dos shpil in libe (The play at love; novella, 1907)
 "Shvayg shvester!" (short story, 1907) 
 A kursistke (A female university student; novella, 1907)
 Tsvishn berg (In the mountains; novella, 1908)

Translations into English
 "In the Mountains", translated by Joachim Neugroschel, in No Star Too Beautiful. Norton: New York, 2002. .
 "Friends", translated by Seymour Levitan, in Have I Got a Story for You. Norton: New York, 2016. 
 Warsaw Stories, translated by Daniel Kennedy. White Goat Press: Amherst, 2019. .
 A Cheerful Soul and Other Stories, translated by Daniel Kennedy. Snuggly Books: Sacramento, 2021. .
 Between Parents, translated by Ollie Elkus and Daniel Kennedy. Farlag Press: Tours, 2021. .

Notes

References

External links
 Free song lyrics in Yiddish and sheet music by Hersh David Nomberg http://ulrich-greve.eu/free/others.html

Polish essayists
Male essayists
1876 births
1927 deaths
19th-century Polish Jews
Folkspartei politicians
Polish male non-fiction writers